Hucks may refer to:

Hucks Gibbs, 1st Baron Aldenham (1819–1907), British banker, businessman and politician
Bentfield Hucks (1884–1918), English aviation pioneer, inventor of the Hucks starter
George Hucks (born 1968), Australian wheelchair rugby player
William Hucks (1672–1740), Member of Parliament for Wallingford (UK Parliament constituency) from 1715 to 1734

See also
Hucks starter, a machine for starting small aircraft engines
Huks, members of the Hukbalahap, a communist guerrilla movement in the Philippines in the 1940s